A Wisdom King (Sanskrit: विद्याराज; IAST: Vidyārāja) is a type of wrathful deity in East Asian Buddhism.

Whereas the Sanskrit name is translated literally as "wisdom / knowledge king(s)," the term vidyā in Vajrayana Buddhism is also specifically used to denote mantras; the term may thus also be rendered "mantra king(s)." Vidyā is translated in Chinese with the character 明 (lit. "bright, radiant", figuratively "knowledge(able), wisdom, wise"), leading to a wide array of alternative translations such as "bright king(s)" or "radiant king(s)". A similar category of fierce deities known as Herukas are found in Tibetan Buddhism.

The female counterparts of Wisdom Kings are known as Wisdom Queens (Sanskrit (IAST): Vidyārājñī, Chinese: 明妃, Míngfēi, Japanese: Myōhi).

Overview

Development

Vidyārājas, as their name suggests, are originally conceived of as the guardians and personifications of esoteric wisdom (vidyā), namely mantras and dharanis. They were seen as embodying the mystic power contained in these sacred utterances.

During the early stages of esoteric (Vajrayana) Buddhism, many of the deities that would become known as vidyārājas (a term that only came into use around the late 7th-early 8th century) were mainly seen as attendants of bodhisattvas who were invoked for specific ends such as the removal of misfortune and obstacles to enlightenment. They personified certain attributes of these bodhisattvas such as their wisdom or the power of their voices and were held to perform various tasks such as gathering together sentient beings to whom the bodhisattva preaches, subjugating unruly elements, or protecting adherents of Buddhism. Eventually, these divinities became objects of veneration in their own right; no longer necessarily paired with a bodhisattva, they became considered as the manifestations of the bodhisattvas themselves and/or of buddhas, who are believed to assume terrifying forms as a means to save sentient beings out of compassion for them. A belief prevalent in the Japanese tradition known as the sanrinjin (三輪身, "bodies of the three wheels") theory for instance posits that five Wisdom Kings are the fierce incarnations (教令輪身, kyōryōrin-shin, lit. "embodiments of the wheel of injunction") of the Five Wisdom Buddhas, who appear both as gentle bodhisattvas who teach the Dharma through compassion and as terrifying vidyārājas who teach through fear, shocking nonbelievers into faith.

The evolution of the vidyārāja will be illustrated here by the deity Yamāntaka, one of the earliest Buddhist wrathful deities. In the 6th century text Mañjuśrī-mūla-kalpa, Yamāntaka is portrayed as the oath-bound servant of the bodhisattva Mañjuśrī who assembles all beings from across the world to hear the Buddha's preaching and vanquishes (and converts) those who are hostile to Buddhism; at the same time, Yamāntaka is also the personification of Mañjuśrī's dharani, the benefits of which are identical to his abilities. He was also commonly depicted in statuary along with Mañjuśrī as a diminutive yaksha-like attendant figure.

Later, as Yamāntaka and similar subordinates of various bodhisattvas (e.g. Hayagrīva, who was associated with Avalokiteśvara) became fully independent deities, they began to be portrayed by themselves and increasingly acquired iconographic attributes specific to each. Yamāntaka for instance is commonly shown with six heads, arms, and legs and riding or standing on a buffalo mount. The status and function of these deities have shifted from being minor emissaries who gather together and intimidate recalcitrant beings to being intimately involved in the primary task of esoteric Buddhism: the transformation of passions and ignorance (avidyā) into compassion and wisdom. As a result of this development, the relationship between Mañjuśrī and Yamāntaka was recontextualized such that Yamāntaka is now considered to be the incarnation of Mañjuśrī himself (so the Mañjuśrī-nāma-samgīti). Eventually, in the sanrinjin interpretation of Japanese esoteric Buddhism, both Yamāntaka and Mañjuśrī - under the name 'Vajratīkṣṇa' (Japanese: 金剛利菩薩, Kongōri Bosatsu) - became classified as avatars of the buddha Amitābha.

Other Wisdom Kings followed a more or less similar development. Hayagrīva, for example, was originally the horse-headed incarnation of the Hindu god Vishnu which was adopted into Buddhism as Avalokiteśvara's attendant (although unlike the Hindu Hayagrīva, the Buddhist figure was never portrayed with a horse's head, instead being depicted like Yamāntaka as a yaksha who may have a miniature horse head emerging from his hair). Eventually, as Hayagrīva increasingly rose to prominence, the distinction between him and his superior became increasingly blurred so that he ultimately turned into one of Avalokiteśvara's many guises in both China and Japan. One of the more famous vidyārājas, Acala (Acalanātha), was originally an acolyte or messenger of the buddha Vairocana before he was interpreted as Vairocana's fierce aspect or kyōryōrin-shin in the Japanese tradition. (In Nepal and Tibet, meanwhile, he is instead identified as the incarnation of either Mañjuśrī or the buddha Akṣobhya.)

Iconography

The iconography of Buddhist wrathful deities are usually considered to be derived from both yaksha imagery and Shaivite iconography, specifically from the wrathful forms of the Hindu god Shiva (e.g. Bhairava).

Wisdom Kings are usually represented as fierce-looking, often with blue or black skin and multiple heads, arms, and legs. They hold various weapons in their hands and are sometimes adorned with skulls, snakes or animal skins and wreathed in flames. This fiery aura is symbolically interpreted as the fire that purifies the practitioner and transforms one's passions into awakening, the so-called "fire samadhi" (火生三昧, Japanese: kashō-zanmai).

Certain vidyārājas bear attributes that reflect the historical rivalry between Hinduism and Buddhism. For instance, the Wisdom King Trailokyavijaya is shown defeating and trampling on the deva Maheśvara (one of the Buddhist analogues to Shiva) and his consort Umā (Pārvatī). A commentary on the Mahavairocana Tantra by the Tang monk Yi Xing meanwhile attributes the taming of Maheśvara to another vidyārāja, Acala. Acala himself is sometimes shown trampling on an elephant-headed demon/deity who may share a common origin with the Hindu Ganesha named Vighnarāja (the "Lord of Obstacles") in Tibetan art.

List of Wisdom Kings

The Five Wisdom Kings
In Chinese and Japanese (Shingon and Tendai) esoteric Buddhism, the Five Great Wisdom Kings (五大明王, Jp. Godai Myōō; Ch. Wǔ Dà Míngwáng), also known as the Five Guardian Kings, are a group of vidyārājas who are considered to be both the fierce emanations of the Five Wisdom Buddhas and the guardians of Buddhist doctrine. Organized according to the five directions (the four cardinal points plus the center), the Five Kings are usually defined as follows:

 Acala / Acalanātha (不動明王; Jp. Fudō Myōō; Ch. 不動明王, Bùdòng Míngwáng) - Manifestation of Mahāvairocana, associated with the center
 Trailokyavijaya (降三世明王; Jp. Gōzanze Myōō; Ch. Xiángsānshì Míngwáng) - Manifestation of Akṣobhya, associated with the east
 Kuṇḍali / Amṛtakuṇḍalin (軍荼利明王, Jp. Gundari Myōō; Ch. Jūntúlì Míngwáng) - Manifestation of Ratnasambhava, associated with the south
 Yamāntaka (大威徳明王; Jp. Daiitoku Myōō; Ch. Dàwēidé Míngwáng) - Manifestation of Amitābha, associated with the west
 Vajrayakṣa (金剛夜叉明王, Jp. Kongōyasha Myōō; Ch. Jīngāng Yèchā Míngwáng) - Manifestation of Amoghasiddhi, associated with the north in the Shingon school
 Ucchuṣma (烏枢沙摩明王; Jp. Ususama Myōō; Ch. Wūshūshāmó Míngwáng) - Associated with the north in the Tendai school

The Eight Wisdom Kings
In Chinese Buddhism, the Eight Great Wisdom Kings (八大明王; pinyin: Bā Dà Míngwáng), is another grouping of Wisdom Kings that is depicted in statues, mural art and paintings. The acknowledged canonical source of the grouping of eight is the Mañjuśrī-mūla-kalpa, the Chinese translation of which (大方廣菩薩藏文殊舍利根本儀軌經; Dà fāngguǎng Púsà Zàng Wénshūshèlì Gēnběn Yíguǐ Jīng, lit. "The Fundamental Ordinance of Mañjuśrī") in about 980-1000 CE is attributed to the monk Tianxizai, who is possibly the north Indian Shantideva. Each of the Wisdom Kings correspond to one of the Eight Great Bodhisattvaszh] in Chinese Buddhism as well as to a specific compass direction.

The Eight Wisdom Kings, with exceptions in certain lists, are usually defined as:
 Acala - Manifestation of the bodhisattva Sarvanivāraṇaviṣkambhin, associated with the north-east
 Kuṇḍali - Manifestation of the bodhisattva Ākāśagarbha, associated with the north-west
 Trailokyavijaya - Manifestation of the bodhisattva Vajrapāṇi, associated with the south-east
Mahācakra (大輪明王; Ch. Dàlún Míngwáng) - Manifestation of the bodhisattva Maitreya, associated with the south-west
Padanakṣipa (步擲明王; Ch. Bùzhì Míngwáng) - Manifestation of the bodhisattva Samantabhadra, associated with the north
Aparājita (無能勝明王; Ch. Wúnéngshēng Míngwáng) - Manifestation of the bodhisattva Kṣitigarbha, associated with the south
Yamāntaka - Manifestation of the bodhisattva Mañjuśrī, associated with the east
Hayagrīva (馬頭觀音; Ch. Mǎtóu Guānyīn) - Manifestation of the bodhisattva Avalokiteśvara (Guanyin), associated with the west

The Ten Wisdom Kings 

Another grouping found in certain Chinese depictions is the Ten Great Wisdom Kings (十大明王; Shí Dà Míngwáng). The acknowledged canonical source of the grouping is from The Sutra of the Liturgy for Brilliant Contemplation of the Ten Wrathful Wisdom Kings of the Illusory Net of the Great Yoga Teachings (佛說幻化網大瑜伽教十忿怒明王大明觀想儀軌經; Fóshuō Huànhuàwǎng Dà yújiājiào Shífènnù Míngwáng Dàmíng Guānxiǎng Yíguǐ Jīng). There are several different groupings of the ten Kings, which differ in the removal and addition of certain vidyārājas, as well as attributing some Kings to different buddhas and bodhisattvas. In medieval and modern Chinese Buddhist practice, the Ten Kings are regularly invoked in repentance ceremonies, such as the Liberation Rite of Water and Land, where they are offered offerings and entreated to expel evil from the ritual platform.

One version of the list of Ten Wisdom Kings are as follows:

 Acala - Manifestation of Sarvanivāraṇaviṣkambhin
 Trailokyavijaya - Manifestation of Vajrapani
Mahācakra - Manifestation of Maitreya
Padanakṣipa - Manifestation of Samantabhadra
Aparājita - Manifestation of Kṣitigarbha
Yamāntaka - Manifestation of Amitābha
Hayagrīva - Manifestation of Avalokiteśvara
Vajrahāsa (大笑明王; Ch. Dàxiào Míngwáng) - Manifestation of Ākāśagarbha
Ucchuṣma (穢跡金剛明王; Ch. Huìjì Jīngāng Míngwáng, lit. "Vajra Being of Impure Traces") - Manifestation of Śakyamuni
Ucchuṣma (?) (火頭金剛明王; Ch. Huǒtóu Jīngāng Míngwáng, lit. "Fire-Headed Vajra Being") - Manifestation of Mahāvairocana

Another version of the list identifies the ten Kings with different buddhas and bodhisattvas:

Acala - Sarvanivāraṇaviṣkambhin
Kuṇḍali - Amitābha
Trailokyavijaya - Vajrapāṇi
Mahācakra - Maitreya
Padanakṣipa - Samantabhadra
Aparājita - Kṣitigarbha 
Yamāntaka - Mañjuśrī
Hayagrīva - Avalokiteśvara
Vajrahāsa - Ākāśagarbha
Mahābala (大力明王; Ch, Dàlì Míngwáng) - Śakyamuni

Others

Other deities to whom the title vidyārāja is applied include:

 Rāgarāja (愛染明王; Ch. Àirǎn Míngwáng; Jp. Aizen Myōō) - A vidyaraja considered to transform worldly lust and sexual passion into spiritual awakening; manifestation of the bodhisattva Vajrasattva and/or the buddha Vairochana.
 Āṭavaka (大元帥明王; Ch. Dàyuánshuài Míngwáng; Jp. Daigensui Myōō or 大元明王, Daigen Myōō) - A yaksha attendant of the deva Vaishravana.
 Mahāmāyūrī (孔雀明王; Ch. Kǒngquè Míngwáng; Jp. Kujaku Myōō) - A Wisdom Queen (vidyārājñī); sometimes also classified as a bodhisattva. Unlike most other vidyārājas, s/he is depicted with a benevolent expression.
Mahākrodharāja (大可畏明王; Ch. Dàkěwèi Míngwáng; Jp. Daikai Myōō) - Attendant or manifestation of Amoghapasha (不空羂索観音; Ch. Bùkōng Juànsuǒ Guānyīn; Jp. Fukū Kensaku/Kenjaku Kannon), one of Avalokiteshvara's forms.
Sadākṣara (六字明王; Ch. Liùzì Míngwáng; Jp. Rokuji Myōō) - A deification of the Sadākṣara (Six-Letter) Sutra Ritual (六字経法; Jp. Rokuji-kyō hō), a rite of subjugation focused on the six manifestations of Avalokiteshvara. Unlike other Wisdom Kings but like Mahamayuri, he sports a gentle bodhisattva-like countenance and is shown with four or six arms and standing on one leg.

Examples 
Examples of depictions of the Eight Wisdom Kings can be found at:

 Cliff reliefs and rock carvings at Shizhongshan Grottoes[zh] in Jianchuan, Yunnan
 Statues in the Datong Guanyin Hall[zh] in Datong, Shanxi
Frescos in the pagoda at Jueshan Temple[zh] in Lingqiu, Shanxi

Examples of depictions of the Ten Wisdom Kings can be found at:

 Rock carvings at the Dazu Rock Carving sites in Dazu, Chongqing
 Statues in Shuanglin Temple near Pingyao, Shanxi
 Statues in Shuilu Nunnery[zh] in Lantian, Xi'an 
 Frescos in Qinglong Temple in Jishan, Shanxi
 Frescos in Yong'an Temple[zh] in Hunyuan, Shanxi
 Frescos in Yunlin Temple[zh]  in Yanggao, Shanxi
 Frescos in Pilu Temple[zh] in Shijiazhuang, Hebei
 Frescos in Dayun Temple[zh] in Hunyuan, Shanxi
 Water and Land Ritual paintings from various temples, such as Baoning Temple[zh] in Youyu, Shanxi (Currently kept in the Shanxi Museum)
 Documents and carvings from the Mogao Caves near Dunhuang, Gansu

Gallery

See also

 Dharmapāla and Lokapāla, guardian deities
Zaō Gongen

Notes

References

Further reading

Wisdom Kings
Buddhist deities
Dharmapalas
Vajrayana
Wrathful deities